Ambrose Light, often called Ambrose Tower, was the light station at the convergence of several major shipping lanes in Lower New York Bay, including Ambrose Channel, the primary passage for ships entering and departing the Port of New York and New Jersey.

On July 25, 2008, the Coast Guard announced that Ambrose Light, which was severely damaged when a tanker struck it on November 3, 2007, would be dismantled.

The removal work was done by Costello Dismantling Co. in September 2008. The tugboats Sea Wolf, Sea Bear and Miss Yvette assisted. The Coast Guard has replaced the light with flashing buoys.

History

Various lightships held this station from 1823 until its replacement in 1967.  The original was only the fourth lightship designed and commissioned to serve a U.S. coastal port. One of these, Lightship Ambrose (built 1908) is now a museum in New York City.

The original light station was put into operation on August 23, 1967, replacing the obsolete Lightship Ambrose, and cost $2.4 million. The tower design was a Texas Tower, a very strong steel pipe structure based on the oil platforms built for use in the Gulf of Mexico. The structure was prefabricated in Norfolk, Virginia and shipped in sections on barges for assembly on-site.

The lower deck was designed for fuel and water storage while the top deck was living quarters for a 6 to 9 man crew. The roof of the platform served as a flight deck for helicopters, the main mode of transport to the station for crew rotations. The tower was automated and the crew was removed from duty on October 15, 1988. Ambrose light station was controlled electronically by the United States Coast Guard station on Governors Island until the island and base were transferred to New York State and City for $1 in 2003.

On a clear night in October 1996 the  Greek oil tanker Aegeo struck the tower, causing severe damage. Coast Guard Lighthouse Technicians verified that the light was functioning properly when the tanker hit the tower. The Aegeo's captain was later found to be at fault. Three years later, in September 1999 after repairs were deemed insufficient, the old structure was razed by the U.S. Army Corps of Engineers and replaced with a new tower.

In January 2001, the  Maltese freighter Kouros V struck the new tower. The tower suffered extensive damage, and the light was rendered inoperable.  A temporary lighted buoy was set by the Coast Guard on November 7.

On November 3, 2007, the  Bahamas-Registered Tankship M/T Axel Spirit struck the tower. This time, Ambrose Light was damaged beyond repair.

On July 25, 2008, the Coast Guard announced the dismantlement of Ambrose Light would begin on July 28, 2008.

The tower carried NOAA's National Data Buoy Center automated weather station ALSN6, which was of interest to scuba divers, fishermen, and other small craft users. The tower was a staging point for pilot ships, notably the Sandy Hook Pilots.

References
Notes

Sources
 Lighthouse Depot - Reference article
  - Ambrose Light is listed as number 720
 
 U.S. Coast Guard - Information on lightships
 National Data Buoy Center - Station ALSN6 - Ambrose Light
 Approaches to New York Harbor, NOAA Chart 12326 online.

External links
 Lighthouse Depot - Story about destruction of original structure
 Night Beacon - About lightships, including Ambrose Lightship
 South Street Seaport Museum - Current location of the Ambrose Lightship
 New Jersey Scuba Diver - Information, charts, and history of Ambrose light station

Lighthouses completed in 1967
Lighthouses completed in 1999
Lighthouses in New York City
Transportation buildings and structures in Queens, New York
Government buildings in Queens, New York
1967 establishments in New York (state)
1967 establishments in New York City